

Swamiji's life

The early years

Yogamaharishi Dr Swami Gitananda Giri Guru Maharaj was born on 24 July 1907, in Maharajganj, northern India, to an Irish mother and a Sindhi father. His father, Sukraj Bhavanani, was a High court Advocate in the Patna High Court and an extensive landowner. His mother Leelavathi was converted to Hinduism through the Arya Samaj rites. Yogamaharishi received his early schooling at home from his mother. Tragically, his mother died when he was but eight years of age. When he was ten years, his Guru, the great Siddha and Master, Yogamaharishi Swami Kanakananda Bhrigu, (Ram Gopal Majumdar) entered his life. For six years, he studied in the Guru Kula of his Master, imbibing not only the traditional education, but also the great mystic sciences of Yoga, Tantra and Yantra.

When he was sixteen years of age, his Guru sent him to England to study medicine. After receiving his medical degree, he entered the British Royal Navy to serve as a doctor on board several ships during World War II. He was injured during the war, and used the time recuperating to further his medical education. He migrated to Canada and set up his practice there, also establishing Yoga schools and centres wherever he lived. Pujya Swamiji was one of the pioneers to introduce Yoga to the Western mind in the early 1950s. He was also instrumental in hosting many visiting Yoga Gurus and Swamijis at his centre in Vancouver. In addition to his busy medical practice, he traveled widely lecturing and teaching. He worked several years for the US Atomic Energy Commission in the United States and also took up assignments for World Health Organization in South America.

Ananda Ashram

He returned to settle permanently in India in 1967 and established the Ananda Ashram in Lawspet, Pondicherry. In 1975 Srila Shri Shankaragiri Swamigal appointed Dr Swami Gitananda Giri as Madathiapathy of Sri Kambali Swamy Madam, which was then a dilapidated Samadhi site of around five acres in Thattanchavady near the Lawspet Ashram. Yogamaharishi Dr Swami Gitananda Giri undertook the renovation of the ancient Samadhi site with great enthusiasm and built what was acclaimed as the Shanti Niketan of South India and An ideal Guru Kula on the Madam lands. Thus Swamiji who was the representative of the North Indian Brighu lineage also became a representative of the Saiva Siddhanta Yoga Tradition of South India.

Gurus of the Kambaliswamy Madam tradition include Srila Sri Kambaliswamigal, Srila Sri Ambalavana Swamigal, Srila Sri Manikka Swamigal, Srila Sri Shanmuga Swamigal, Srila Sri Velu Swamigal, Srila Sri Subramaniya Swamigal and Srila Sri Shankaragiri Swamigal. Pujya Swamiji became an active fighter for Hindu rights and leader of the Hindu community in addition to his many other numerous duties. He served as vice president of the All India Association of Maths and Ashrams under the presidency of Sri Jayendra Saraswathi Swamigal the senior Shankaracharya of the Kanchi Kamakoti Petam.

Achievements

He wrote twenty-five books on the subjects of Yoga and made ten world tours and more than twenty All India tours. He was the Chief Guest for innumerable Yoga, Medical and Scientific Conferences, Seminars and meetings held all over India and was in great demand as a speaker because of his immense and charismatic vitality. Known as the Lion of Pondicherry he was a great example of an ancient Yoga Rishi (Seer). Majestic in bearing and manner, with luxurious flowing beard and hair, and a magnificent, booming, powerful voice, Swamijis dynamic personality captured the hearts of people wherever he went.

Pujya Swamiji was Patron and President of many Yoga and Scientific Organisations World Wide. Notably he was Patron of the Indian Academy of Yoga with headquarters at the famous Banaras Hindu University. This is an organisation of eminent Yogis, professional men, scientists and doctors interested in Yoga. He was President of Vishwa Yoga Samaj, a World Wide Organisation of Yogis, and Vice President of the All India Association of Madathiapathis. He was also the Governor-General for Yoga (1992–1995) in the World development Parliament (Vishwa Unnayan Samsad) with headquarters in West Bengal, India. He trained many students in Rishiculture Ashtanga (Gitananda) Yoga. His students have established more than 135 centres of Yoga in 30 countries around the world.

He received many honors in his lifetime. He was chosen by the Ministry of Health, Government of India, New Delhi, as a Governing Body Member of the prestigious Central Council for Research in Yoga and Naturopathy in March 1986 and he held this post till his death in 1993. He was awarded YOGA SHIROMANI by the then President of India Sri Zail Singh at the World Yoga Conference held at the Asian Village, New Delhi in December 1986. The Vishwa Unnayan Samsad at New Delhi honoured him in 1992 with the title Father of Modern Yoga Science. Pujya Swamiji had himself organised five World Conferences in Pondicherry, attended by professional persons and Yogis from all over the world. He sponsored the First Ever International Yoga Asana Competition in Pondicherry in 1989. Since that time an International Yoga Competition has been held each year in various places in South America, India and Europe. He was one of the driving forces behind Yoga Sports. In this regard he is considered the Founding Father of the Yoga Sport Movement. Due to his inspiration and support, the Government of Pondicherry instituted an annual International Yoga Festival from January 1993 in Pondicherry, which features lectures by eminent speakers, Yoga Asana Competitions, and Yogic cultural programmes etc. Due to his influence, the Government of Pondicherry has also instituted Yoga teaching in all Government schools from 1997.

Pujya Swamiji collaborated with many films makers in making educational films on Yoga, including the famous film MUDRAS by Rajiv Mehrotra. He also was the guiding spirit behind the immensely popular television series YOGA FOR YOUTH, directed by Yogacharini Meenakshi Devi Bhavanani which has been broadcast for several years from 1989 over Doordarshan, Indias national television network.

Swamiji was a great scientist and researcher and presented more than thirty papers on his scientific research into Yoga at various Conferences throughout India. He collaborated with scientists from leading institutes throughout the country including AIIMS in New Delhi, NIMHANS in Bangalore, DIPAS (Indian Defense Institute) in New Delhi and JIPMER in Pondicherry.

His work is carried on by his son and successor Yogacharya Dr Ananda Balayogi Bhavanani under the benevolent guidance of Ammaji Yogacharini Meenakshi Devi Bhavanani who is current Resident Acharya ICYER at Ananda Ashram.

Publications

Masterpieces of Rishiculture Ashtanga (Gitananda) Yoga Instruction Containing a Synthesis of Classical Yoga Concepts with Modern Scientific Knowledge

 Yoga Life: Monthly Journal
 Yoga: Step-By-Step
 Yoga Samyama
 Yoga Life Annual
 Yoga World Wide Directory 1992
 Siddhis and Riddhis
 Yoga For Expectant Mothers And Others
 Yoga:One Woman's View
 Yoga and Sports
 Surya Namaskar
 Yantra
 Tribute to a Great Guru
 A Heart That Is Distant
 Frankly Speaking
 The Ashtanga Yoga of Patanjali
 A Yogic Approach to Stress
 Yoga and Modern Man
 A Primer of Yoga Theory
 Yoga: 1 to 10
 Yoga For Breathing Disorders
 Hatha Yoga of Gitananda Yoga (Tamil)
 Gita Inspirations (Poetry & Short Articles By Swamiji)
 Mudras 
 Thirukkural and Yoga
 Yoga for Weight Loss
 Chakras
 Yoga For Health and Healing
 Pranayama in Gitananda Tradition
 Yoga and Wellness 
 Understanding the Yoga Darshan 
 Yoga for a Wholistic Personality 
 Yoga Chikitsa: The Application of Yoga as a Therapy 
 Saraswati's Pearls –Dialogues on the Yoga of Sound
 Yoga Dristhi

References

External links
 International Centre for Yoga Education and Research
 Rishiculture Ashtanga (Gitananda) Yoga

Royal Navy officers of World War II
1907 births
1993 deaths
Indian yoga teachers